Rabbi Moses Samuel Zuckermandl, also Zuckermandel (24 April 1836, Uherský Brod, Moravia  27 January 1917, Breslau (now Wrocław), Silesia) was a Czech-German rabbi, Talmudist, and Jewish theologian.

Biography
Zuckermandl was a student of Samson Raphael Hirsch in Nikolsburg. He subsequently studied at the Jewish Theological Seminary of Breslau.

He became a rabbi in Pleschen (now Pleszew), Prussia, and was appointed lecturer of the Mora-Leipziger Foundation at Breslau, on 1 April 1898.  His major literary efforts related to the Tosefta and included the first critical edition based on variant manuscripts, particularly the Erfurt manuscript.

Literary works 
 Die Erfurter Handschrift der Tosefta (1876)
 Die Tosefta nach den Erfurter und Wiener Handschriften (1880–1882)
 Spruchbuch Enthaltend Biblische Sprüche aus dem Gebetbuche (1889)
 Vokabularium und Grammatik zu den Hebräischen Versen des Spruchbuches I. (1890)

See also
 Old Synagogue (Erfurt)

References
, by Isidore Singer, Newell Dunbar
 Moshe David Herr, Zuckermandel, Moses Samuel; in Encyclopaedia Judaica, Second Edition, Volume 21.

1836 births
1917 deaths
People from Uherský Brod
19th-century German rabbis
19th-century Czech rabbis
Talmudists
German Jewish theologians
German male non-fiction writers
Moravian Jews